Mount Vernon Outland Airport  is a civil public use airport three miles (5 km) east of Mount Vernon, in Jefferson County, Illinois.

It has no scheduled airline, but it was once served by Air Kentucky doing business as US Airways Express. From the 1960s through the mid-1980s the airport was also served by Ozark Airlines. This ended with Ozark Airlines being sold to Trans World Airlines (TWA) in 1986.

The airport is named for longtime airport board member Earl Outland. It is home to EAA Chapter 1155.

The airport was a stop in the 45th annual Air Race Classic in 2022 when a group of pilots raced parts across America. The airport was originally set to be a stop in the 2020 version, which was put on hold because of the COVID-19 pandemic.

Facilities 
 5/23:  asphalt
 15/33:  asphalt

Aircraft 
For the 12-month period ending December 31, 2021, the airport has 73 aircraft operations per day, or about 27,000 per year. This is 70% general aviation, 8% air taxi, and 2% military. For the same time period, there are 38 aircraft based on the field: 26 single-engine, 6 helicopters, 5 multi engine, and 1 jet.

References

External links 

 http://www.mtvernonairport.com

Airports in Illinois
Buildings and structures in Jefferson County, Illinois
Former Essential Air Service airports